Dimona Radar Facility (Hebrew: מתקן המכ"ם בדימונה) is a radar facility near Dimona, Israel.

History
The Dimona Radar facility has two 400 meter (1,300 feet) tall radar towers designed to track ballistic missiles through space and provide ground-based missiles with the targeting data needed to intercept them.  

References

Towers in Israel
Military installations of Israel
Radar Facility